The Gewächshaus für tropische Nutzpflanzen is a botanical garden specializing in tropical crops, maintained by the University of Kassel. It is located in greenhouses at Steinstraße 19, Witzenhausen, Hesse, Germany, and open several afternoons per week.

The greenhouses were first established in 1902 to support the colonial School of Agriculture, Trade and Industry (founded 1898), and then consisted of a central palm house with adjacent tropical and cold houses. These houses were replaced in 1937 with larger facilities which were extensively damaged in World War II. Postwar reconstruction was slow and the greenhouses did not resume operation until 1957 under the auspices of the Deutschen Instituts für Tropische und Subtropische Landwirtschaft GmbH (DITSL).

See also 
 List of botanical gardens in Germany

References 
 Das Gewächshaus für tropische Nutzpflanzen, Führer für Besucher, Witzenhausen : Gewächshaus für tropische Nutzpflanzen, 1997–98, 2nd edition.
 Wolff, P.; Hethke, M.; Hammer, K.: "100 Jahre Gewächshäuser für tropische Nutzpflanzen - von der kolonialen Pflanzensammlung zur Forschungs- und Bildungseinrichtung", in Der Tropenlandwirt, Tropenlandwirte Witzenhausen e.V., Kassel, 2002.

External links
 Gewächshaus für tropische Nutzpflanzen
 Hermann von Helmholtz-Zentrum entry

Botanical gardens in Germany
Gardens in Hesse